Myristica maingayi is a species of plant in the family Myristicaceae. It is a tree found in Sumatra, Peninsular Malaysia and Singapore.

References

maingayi
Trees of Sumatra
Trees of Malaya
Near threatened flora of Asia
Taxonomy articles created by Polbot